St Faith's and Aylsham Rural Districts were adjacent rural districts in Norfolk, England from 1894 to 1935.

They were formed under the Local Government Act 1894 based on rural sanitary districts of the same names, and lay to the north of Norwich.

In 1935 some northern parts of Aylsham RD were variously transferred to Walsingham, Erpingham and Smallburgh RDs. The remainder, and the whole of St Faith's RD, were merged to form St Faith's and Aylsham Rural District. Changes to the border with Norwich County Borough were made in 1907, 1951 and 1968.

In 1974, the merged district was abolished under the Local Government Act 1972, and became part of the Broadland district.

Statistics

Parishes
These parishes operated within St Faith's and Aylsham RD unless otherwise indicated.

References

Districts of England created by the Local Government Act 1894
Districts of England abolished by the Local Government Act 1972
Historical districts of Norfolk
Rural districts of England